The 2009 Boston College Eagles football team represented Boston College in the 2009 NCAA Division I FBS football season as a member of the Atlantic Division of the Atlantic Coast Conference. The Eagles were led by first-year head coach Frank Spaziani. He replaced Jeff Jagodzinski who was fired after the 2008 season. The Eagles finished the season 8–5, 5–3 in ACC play and lost in the Emerald Bowl 24–13 against USC.

Preseason
Mobile quarterback Anthony Haney (New Jersey recruit) was injured in an early preseason practice due to a career ending arm injury

Mark Herzlich
Mark Herzlich, a senior linebacker and the 2008 ACC Defensive Player of the Year, revealed on May 14 that he had been diagnosed with Ewing's sarcoma, a cancer most commonly found in bone or soft tissue. In his statement, he indicated he was unsure what his illness would mean for his football future.

Season Highlights
In the Eagles 52–20 win over NC State, Sophomore RB Montel Harris set two single-game school records when he rushed for 264 yards and 5 TDs.

On October 3, College Gameday came to Boston College for the Eagles' game against the Florida State Seminoles. During the broadcast, star LB Mark Herzlich, who was forced to miss the entire 2009 season after being diagnosed with Ewing's Sarcoma, publicly announced that he was cancer-free. BC went on to beat the Seminoles by a score of 28–21.

Early in the season, Boston College won in thrilling fashion as the Eagles defeated Wake Forest 27–24 in OT. Boston College had the ball first in OT and kicked a field goal. On Wake Forest's possession, the Demon Deacons had a First and Goal from the 3 yard line. Amazingly, Isaac Johnson stripped Riley Skinner and Wes Davis recovered the ensuing fumble to snatch victory from the jaws of defeat.

True freshman Luke Kuechly was pressed into service as a weakside linebacker due to the unexpected departure of Herzlich and became a national sensation.  He led the team and conference and finished second in the nation in Total Tackles with 158. Kuechly was named to the CFN All-America Team, the ACC Defensive Rookie of the Year, and the Defensive MVP of the Emerald Bowl.

Schedule

Drafted Players

References

Boston College
Boston College Eagles football seasons
Boston College Eagles football
Boston College Eagles football